"Regeneration" is an episode in the Australian/British science fiction drama television series K-9. It is the first episode of Series 1 and the first episode of the show. It features a cameo appearance from the original K-9 Mark I.

Synopsis
Whilst Starkey and Jorjie are trying to escape the police they take refuge in a large detached house, now the residence of reclusive scientist, Professor Gryffen and a robot dog, K-9 Mark I. After the ensuing battle with the Jixen, K-9 regenerates.

Plot
Two men arrive at the home and lab of Professor Alistair Gryffen with a case. After providing the case, containing a piece of technology from a "fallen angel" (a downed alien craft) they inform him that The Department wants a full report within 24 hours.

Elsewhere, Starkey, a teenage boy, is near an outdoor public display board terminal and is hacking in to post a dissident message against the government. As he finishes Jorjie Turner, a teenage girl, arrives to yet again propose working together. Starkey refuses, but when the robot police arrive, the pair run off together. They find themselves in a back alley with police just around both ends. In desperation they try a number of doors until they find one unlocked.

Once inside, they find the lab of Professor Gryffen. They hide in the shadows and watch as Gryffen begins an experiment with his STM (Space-Time Manipulator). As they prepare to leave Starkey kicks the power plug from the wall and the machines goes haywire. Instead of bringing back the professor's lost family, four Jixen warriors arrive through the STM's beam. As Gryffen and the two teens attempt to escape the creatures, Starkey is hit with their "Jixen slime" projectile secretions. As Jorjie and Gryffen turn to aid Starkey a fifth being comes through the beam. This time it's a dog like robot who tells the humans that his power is running low and that he must self-destruct in order to destroy the 4 creatures. As the team leaves the building, an explosion rocks the room and looking back they see the parts of the robot dog thrown across the floor.

As they look around Starkey picks up an object that is still active. Shortly Darius, Gryffen's assistant arrives and sees the damage. Hearing the name "Stark Reality" (a name Starkey goes by) quietly calls the CCPCs (robot police) while Starkey apologizes to the professor. Just then the object that Starkey has found begins to pulse and float into the air. Soon the parts of the robot dog are reintegrated and refashioned into a new, more futuristic, design. The robot introduces himself as K-9 and begins to recalibrate his systems, including his new flight system.

Just as the new K-9 exits the building for a flight test, the CCPCs arrive and place Starkey under arrest, telling him of a sentence of 6 months in VR (virtual reality) detention. As everyone begins to exit the lab, a lone surviving Jixen warrior is seen sneaking off into the shadows.

As Professor Gryffen works with K-9, K-9 informs the Professor that his memory has been scrambled and that he does not remember who he is. He also tells Gryffen that the "Jixen slime" from the Jixen is used to mark their enemies for later tracking. As such, any other Jixen that ever smell Starkey will recognize him as their enemy. Asking about the STM, Gryffen tells K-9 that it was reconstructed from parts found in "Fallen Angels", a spacecraft that has landed on Earth.

Meanwhile, Starkey is in a room wearing VR goggles. He sees a white room with nothing to do. Suddenly Jorjie appears, having used her own goggles and her hacking skills to communicate with him. From the system she shows him images of aliens that have been locked up, and are being experimented on, in a secret Department facility. She tells Starkey that the reason she wanted to work together with him was to expose this facility to the public. Starkey points out that he is already in detention and can't help her.

Soon alarms go off in the facility and the Jixen enters the corridor leading to Starkey's cell. The alarms trigger the end of the VR session and Starkey turns to see the Jixen enter his cell. After being sprayed a second time with the Jixen's "slime", a CCPC enters and is attacked by the Jixen. This gives Starkey enough time to exit the cell and escape.

Back at Gryffen's lab, Darius is fixing Mariah, Gryffen's antique car. As Darius and Gryffen talk about K-9 and how should let him stay with them, then Starkey enters the lab. Covered with "Jixen slime", K-9's repairing systems identify Starkey to be a Jixen warrior. Only Gryffen's protestations and Starkey repeating some of the first words he said to K-9, cause K-9 to stop.

As that crisis is averted June Turner, Gryffen's primary contact with the Department, and Jorjie's mother, arrives to talk about the explosion in the lab, a robot "dog" that was seen in the vicinity near the time of the explosion, and to ask if Gryffen has seen Starkey since his escape. While Starkey and K-9 hide behind a bank of cabinets, June makes it clear that capturing the robot "dog" is a priority of the Department and that she expects Gryffen to find him and bring him in for study.

After Jane leaves, Starkey tells Darius that no one has ever stuck up for him like Gryffen has, and Darius agrees that the professor is a great guy. Starkey also thanks Darius for not turning him in. Darius tells Starkey that there will be other times. As Jorjie enters K-9 tells her about nearly "neutralizing" Starkey, and to apologize K-9 gives Starkey a special whistle that will call K-9 wherever Starkey is.

Continuity
The main K-9 is an alternative to the K-9 Mark I that first appeared in "The Invisible Enemy".
"Regeneration" is the first of three parts, the second being "Liberation" and the third being "The Korven".
There was a production error when K-9 gives Starkey the whistle, he says that if Starkey blows it, it will "call you to my side." He meant it the other way around: "call me to your side".
K-9 informs Professor Gryffen that much of his memory was damaged in his self-destruction, as such K-9 no longer seems to remember The Doctor, whether he remembers Romana and Leela is yet to be seen.
K-9 Mark I dies by self-destruction in order to kill hostile aliens and save humans in London; K-9 Mark III met his end in the identical fashion in "School Reunion".

Story Notes
Before his "regeneration", the K-9 that is seen is identical to the original models used on Doctor Who. According to K-9 creator Bob Baker, this is meant to be K-9 Mark I who was last seen on screen remaining on Gallifrey with Leela. This then implies that K-9 Mark I survived the Last Great Time War.
When Professor Gryffen triggers a piece of music stored in K-9's memory, K-9 informs the professor that he cannot name the tune. The 3 notes that are played are the first three notes of the Doctor Who theme song.
The day before this episode was broadcast in the UK on Disney XD, another K-9 (K-9 Mark IV) appeared with the Tenth Doctor in The Wedding of Sarah Jane Smith on CBBC on BBC One.
Professor Gryffen's laboratory & home is in a disused police station which still bears the exterior appearance of its former purpose (police lamp next to the front door, signage, inter alia); the building is shown in "The Cambridge Spy" to have been an active police station as recently as 23 November 1963. This parallels the TARDIS' exterior appearance as a 1963 police box.

External links 
 
 K9 Official
 The Doctor Who Site

K-9 (TV series) episodes
2009 British television episodes